Mohammad Sidiq Walizada (born 27 December 1991) is an Afghan footballer who currently plays for v.v. Zuidland in the Netherlands, and Afghanistan national football team.

Career
Sidiq began his football career since 2012 in the Netherlands. Currently he is playing for Rotterdam club v.v. Zuidland.

Afghan Football Club World Championship
Walizada also plays for F.C. Holland. It is a team where players from all over Holland participate. The team made it to the final of the Afghan Football Club World Championship in Dubai. The played against Brishna F.C. and won the title by a goal from Walizada. He played an outstanding match. They also won a cheque of $50,000 dollars.

International career
He scored a hat-trick in the 2nd, 36th and 80th minutes of the match, in India, where Afghanistan played against Bhutan in 2012 AFC Challenge Cup qualification.

International goals
Scores and results list Afghanistan's goal tally first.

Personal
In 2011, he and his family did go to the Netherlands because of their safety. He is now living in the Netherlands and is hoping to play again for the National Football Team of Afghanistan.

Honours

Afghanistan
SAFF Championship: 2013

References

Afghan footballers
Afghanistan international footballers
Living people
1993 births
Footballers from Kabul
Association football forwards